Armada panaceorum is a moth of the family Noctuidae first described by Édouard Ménétries in 1848. It is found in the arid parts of North Africa, the Near East and the Middle East, Kazakhstan, eastern Afghanistan, Mongolia, Tibet and south-eastern Turkey.

There is one generation per year. Adults are on wing from March to April.

The larvae feed on Arnebia decumbens, Lappula ceratophora and Heterocaryum rigidum

External links

Image

Armadini
Insects of Turkey
Moths of the Middle East